Achyranthes splendens (Ewa hinahina; also called Maui chaff flower, round chaff flower, round-leaf chaff flower, or round-leaved chaff flower) is a species of flowering plant in the pigweed family, Amaranthaceae, that is endemic to Hawaii.  Its natural habitats are dry forests, low shrublands, and sandy shores. It is threatened by habitat loss.

References

splendens
Endemic flora of Hawaii
Taxonomy articles created by Polbot